Tara Williams (born July 23, 1974) is a former professional basketball player.

Auburn statistics
Source

References

1974 births
Living people
Phoenix Mercury players
Portland Fire players
Auburn Tigers women's basketball players